Besh-Künggöy (also Besh-Kyungey) is a village in the Alamüdün District in Chüy Region of Kyrgyzstan. Its population was 3,856 in 2021. It was established in 1898.

Notable people
Ismailbek Taranchiev (April 6, 1923 - April 26, 1944) - Soviet aviator, Hero of the Soviet Union.

References

Populated places in Chüy Region
Populated places established in 1898